Agni-IV ("Fire") is the fourth in the Agni series of missiles which was earlier known as Agni II prime. It has been developed by India's DRDO and displayed a number of new technologies and significant improvement in missile technology. The missile is light-weight and has two stages of solid propulsion and a payload with re-entry heat shield. With 4,000 km range, it is capable of striking targets in nearly all of mainland China, if launched from northeastern part of India.

Development

This missile is one of a kind, proving many new technologies for the first time, and represents a significant leap in India's missile technology. The missile is lighter in weight and uses a two-stage rocket engine powered by solid propellant. The Composite Rocket Motor which has been used for the first time has given excellent performance. The missile system is equipped with modern and compact avionics with redundancy to provide a high level of reliability. The indigenous-built ring laser gyroscope is used in the high accuracy with Micro Inertial Navigation System (MINGS), which complement each other as a redundancy. The high performance onboard computer with distributed Avionics architecture, high speed reliable communication bus and a full Digital Control System have controlled and guided the missile to the target. The missile reached the target with a high level of accuracy. Radars and electro-optical systems along the Coast of Odisha have tracked and monitored all the parameters of the missile. Two Indian Naval ships located near the target witnessed the final event.

Dr Vijay Kumar Saraswat, Scientific Advisor to Raksha Mantri, Secretary, Department of Defence R&D and Director General DRDO, who witnessed the launch, congratulated all the scientists and employees of DRDO and the Armed Forces for the successful launch of AGNI-IV. Sri Avinash Chander, Chief Controller (Missiles & Strategic Systems), DRDO and Programme Director of AGNI, while addressing the scientists after the launch, called it as a new era in the modern Long Range Navigation System in India. He said, "this test has paved the way ahead for the success of Agni-V Mission, which will be launched shortly".

Project Director of Agni-IV, Tessy Thomas with her team prepared and integrated the missile system and launched the missile successfully. According to her, DRDO has produced and proven many new state of the art technologies in the Missile System like Composite Rocket Motors, very high accuracy Ring Laser Gyro based Inertial Navigation System, Micro Navigation System, Digital Controller System and very powerful onboard computer system. The missile, having capability to carry strategic nuclear warheads for the forces, has provided a fantastic deterrence to the country and it will be produced in numbers and delivered to the Armed Forces as early as possible. Sri S.K. Ray, Director RCI, Sri P. Venugopalan, Director DRDL, Dr V.G. Sekaran Director ASL and Sri S.P. Dash, Director ITR were also present during the launch and reviewed all the activities.

The DRDO had produced and proven many new state of the art technologies with the Agni-IV like composite rocket motors, very high accuracy Ring Laser Gyro based Inertial Navigation System, Micro Navigation System, Digital Controller System and very powerful onboard computer system.
Agni-IV bridges the gap between Agni-II and Agni-III. Agni IV can carry a warhead of 1 tonne. It is designed to increase the kill efficiency along with a higher range performance. Its length is 20 meters and launch weight 17 tonnes. It can be fired from a road mobile launcher.
Efforts are being made to fine-tune the Agni missiles to defeat anti-ballistic missile systems. The radar cross-section and other detectable signatures of Agni-IV have been significantly reduced to make them much more immune to counter-measures.

Testing
Agni-IV has undergone seven successful tests over the course of six years.

15 November 2011: Agni-IV was successfully test fired for the first time, from a road-mobile launcher at 9am from Wheeler Island off the coast of Orissa. The missile followed its trajectory, attained a height of about 900 km and reached the pre-designated target in international waters of the Bay of Bengal. All mission objectives were fully met.
19 September 2012: The missile was successfully test-fired again for its full range of 4,000 km from the Wheeler Island, off the Orissa coast. The missile lifted off from a road mobile launcher at 11:48a.m. and after zooming to an altitude of over 800 km, it re-entered the atmosphere and impacted near the pre-designated target in the Indian Ocean with remarkable degree of accuracy following a 20-minute flight.
20 January 2014: The missile was test-fired in the actual weapon and road-mobile configuration of the Strategic Forces Command (SFC), from the launch complex-4 of the Integrated Test Range at Wheeler Island off Orissa coast. The missile traveled a vertical distance of 850 km and covered its full range of 4,000 km. The onboard ring laser gyro-based inertial navigation system (RINS) and the micro-navigation system (MINGS) enabled the missile to fall within 100 meters of its target.
2 December 2014: The missile was successfully test-fired by the Army's Strategic Forces Command (SFC). This was the first user trial and fourth consecutive successful flight. The missile has been inducted into the Indian Army.
9 November 2015: Agni IV was successfully test-fired as part of a user trial by the tri-Service Strategic Forces Command (SFC). According to DRDO officials, the missile met all mission parameters.
2 January 2017: Agni IV was successfully test-fired as part of a user trial by the Strategic Forces Command (SFC) at 11:55am from launch complex-4 of the Integrated Test Range (ITR) at Wheeler Island. According to DRDO officials, the user trial met all mission objectives.
23 December 2018: The Agni IV was successfully test fired from Launch Complex-4 of the Integrated Test Range (ITR) at Abdul Kalam Island at around 8:35am.
6 June 2022: A successful training launch of an Intermediate-Range Ballistic Missile Agni-IV was carried out at approximately 19.30 pm hours on June 6 from APJ Abdul Kalam Island, Odisha

See also

References

External links
Video of Agni IV test
Picture of Agni IV being launched

Ballistic missiles of India
Intermediate-range ballistic missiles
Military equipment introduced in the 2010s